Manuel Rueda García (born 2 January 1980 in San Fernando, Cádiz, Andalusia) is a Spanish retired footballer who played as a central defender.

External links

1980 births
Living people
People from San Fernando, Cádiz
Sportspeople from the Province of Cádiz
Spanish footballers
Footballers from Andalusia
Association football defenders
Segunda División players
Segunda División B players
Tercera División players
RCD Mallorca B players
Caravaca CF players
Águilas CF players
Lorca Deportiva CF footballers
UE Sant Andreu footballers
AD Alcorcón footballers
FC Cartagena footballers